Candalides absimilis, the pencilled blue or common pencil-blue, is a species of butterfly of the family Lycaenidae. It is found along the east coast of Australia, including Queensland, the Australian Capital Territory, New South Wales and Victoria.

The wingspan is about 30 mm. Adult males are grey blue, while females are brown on top with a large white patch on each wing and a purple sheen near the hinges. The underside of both sexes is white with rows of fawn carets.

The larvae have been recorded feeding on buds and young shoots of a wide range of plants, including Flagellaria, Macadamia integrifolia, Castanospermum australe, Erythrina, Callerya megasperma, Wisteria, Cassia fistula, Alectryon coriaceus, Brachychiton acerifolius and Cupaniopsis. They are green with a dark dorsal line and diagonal white marks along the sides and a brown head. Pupation takes place in a brown pupa with a length of about 15 mm.

References

Candalidini
Butterflies described in 1862